Liliane Montagne (born 16 March 1931) is a French former gymnast. She competed in seven events at the 1952 Summer Olympics.

References

External links
 

1931 births
Possibly living people
French female artistic gymnasts
Olympic gymnasts of France
Gymnasts at the 1952 Summer Olympics
Place of birth missing (living people)
20th-century French women